Raymond Côté (born January 10, 1967) is a Canadian politician, who was elected to the House of Commons of Canada in the 2011 election. He represented the electoral district of Beauport—Limoilou as a member of the New Democratic Party.

Prior to being elected, Côté worked for Services Québec. He ran unsuccessfully in Lotbinière—Chutes-de-la-Chaudière in both the 2006 and 2008 elections. Côté has a Bachelor of Arts degree from the Université Laval in economics and international relations. In the 2018 New Democratic Party of Quebec leadership election, Côté stood for leadership of the restarted provincial-level NDP, but he lost to Raphaël Fortin.

Electoral history

References

External links

1967 births
Living people
Members of the House of Commons of Canada from Quebec
New Democratic Party MPs
Politicians from Quebec City
Université Laval alumni
21st-century Canadian politicians